United Nations Security Council Resolution 437, adopted on October 10, 1978, after recalling Resolution 253 (1968) which prevented Member States from allowing those connected to the regime in Southern Rhodesia to enter their territory, the Council noted with regret the decision by the United States to allow Ian Smith and other members of the "illegal regime" to enter the country. Therefore, the resolution considered this action to be in violation of Resolution 253.

The Council called on the United States to observe the provisions of the Security Council and expressed hope that the U.S. will continue to exert its influence in Southern Rhodesia so that majority rule can be achieved.

The resolution was approved by 11 votes to none; Canada, West Germany, the United Kingdom and United States abstained.

See also
 List of United Nations Security Council Resolutions 401 to 500 (1976–1982)
 Rhodesian Bush War
 Unilateral Declaration of Independence (Rhodesia)

External links
 
Text of the Resolution at undocs.org

 0437
 0437
October 1978 events
1978 in Rhodesia